Thomas Anderson (born 1916) was an English professional footballer who played as a goalkeeper.

References

1916 births
Possibly living people
Footballers from Gateshead
English footballers
Association football goalkeepers
Grimsby Town F.C. players
English Football League players